is a Japanese politician of the Democratic Party of Japan, a member of the House of Councillors in the Diet (national legislature). A native of Sakai, Osaka and graduate of Osaka University, he was elected for the first time in 2007.

References

External links 
  in Japanese.

Members of the House of Councillors (Japan)
Living people
1975 births
People from Sakai, Osaka
Democratic Party of Japan politicians
Osaka University alumni
21st-century Japanese politicians